Acmopyle sahniana is a species of conifer in the family Podocarpaceae. It is found only in Fiji. It is threatened by habitat loss.

References

Podocarpaceae
Endemic flora of Fiji
Critically endangered plants
Taxonomy articles created by Polbot